Hugo Barra (born in Belo Horizonte, Brazil) is a Brazilian computer scientist, technology executive and entrepreneur. From 2008 to 2013, he served in a number of product management roles at Google in London and California, including Vice President and product spokesperson of Google's Android division. From 2013 to 2017, he worked at Xiaomi as Vice President, Global. From 2017 to 2021, he worked as Vice President of Virtual Reality and Head of the Oculus division at Facebook. In May 2021, he left Facebook to start health technology startup Detect.

Early life and education
Barra attended primary and secondary schools at local Colégio Pitágoras in Belo Horizonte, Brazil, and in 1995 enrolled at the Universidade Federal de Minas Gerais (UFMG), majoring in Electrical Engineering.

In 1996, Barra transferred to the  Massachusetts Institute of Technology (MIT), graduating with bachelor's degrees in electrical engineering & computer science (EECS), and management science, as well as a masters degree in electrical engineering & computer science. He was class president of the Class of 2000 and student keynote speaker at MIT Commencement 2000.

While at MIT, Barra was a researcher at the MIT Media Lab working under Professor Pattie Maes in the Software Agents group; a software engineering intern at Walt Disney Imagineering working on DisneyQuest; a software engineering intern at Netscape Communications working on Netscape Navigator 4; and a summer analyst at McKinsey & Company.

Career
In 1999, Barra co-founded startup Lobby7 with other MIT classmates with investment from SoftBank Group. In 2003, the company was acquired by speech recognition technology company ScanSoft, which subsequently became Nuance Communications. While at Nuance from 2003 to 2007, Barra led a multi-year project alongside CTO Vlad Sejnoha to develop a server-based version of the company's flagship Dragon NaturallySpeaking speech-to-text dictation technology, which is rumored to have been the foundation to Apple Inc.'s Siri voice assistant.

Google 

Barra joined American technology company Google in London in March 2008 as Group Product Manager for the Google Mobile team. In the Google Mobile team, Barra led the development of several early versions of Google's flagship mobile applications, such as Google Voice Search, which became the technological foundation for the Google Assistant, as well as Google Maps Navigation with vector-based graphics, Google Translate with "conversation mode", the Google Goggles mobile camera app, and several others.

In 2010 Barra joined the Android team as Director of Product Management. From 2010 to 2013, Barra's role expanded to include product spokesperson for the Android team, speaking at both press conferences and Google I/O, Google's annual developer-focused conference. Barra headlined the main keynote presentation at Google IO 2011, Google IO 2012, and Google IO 2013. Barra's product leadership included the entire Android ecosystem of software and hardware, including Honeycomb, Ice Cream Sandwich, Jelly Bean and KitKat operating system launches, the Nexus 4 and Nexus 5 smartphones, the Nexus 7 and Nexus 10 tablets, and other related products such as Google Now, selected in 2013 as Popular Science's Innovation of the Year. He was promoted to Vice President of Android Product Management in 2012.

Xiaomi
In September 2013, Barra left Google for Chinese electronics company Xiaomi, serving as Vice President of International. The move was considered a ‘significant hire’ for Xiaomi, one of the fastest growing manufacturers in China, enhancing international legitimacy to the company by adding a key former Google Android executive to its senior management.

In December 2013, Barra spoke at LeWeb tech conference in Paris, France about his impressions of the Chinese economy and the opportunity it represented for tech companies such as Xiaomi, citing China's 600 million internet users, high market caps of recent Chinese IPOs, the massive scale of the top Chinese apps' monthly active users, and the size of companies such as Alibaba's Taobao, a shopping site more than double the size of eBay and Amazon combined. The talk was widely cited throughout the industry.

In February 2014, Barra announced the launch of the new Redmi and Mi3 smartphones in Singapore, then in India. Global expansion outside of China into surrounding emerging markets is a key initiative for Xiaomi, given the company's business model to release high performance smartphone products at an affordable consumer price, generating revenue not only from the hardware itself, but the software and internet services provided to the consumer. According to Xiaomi co-founder and president Lei Jun, it is "entirely Barra’s job to figure out which region that we should enter next and how." Barra has stated intentions to expand next into various countries.

In March 2014, Barra visited Foxconn, a Taiwanese manufacturing company with plants in Brazil and Mexico responsible for assembling products for various tech brands, indicating plans for Xiaomi to expand into Latin America.

In May 2014, Barra announced the launch of the Mi Pad, a 7.9 inch tablet. "We spent four years working up to the point where we thought we had the right hardware design and software capability to build a world-class tablet," Barra said. "We think we are there, finally." Barra described the release as part of Xiaomi's overall strategy to expand both its product lineup and into new international markets including Hong Kong, Taiwan, and Singapore. Barra also indicated eventual plans to enter the U.S. market.

In January 2017, Barra announced his departure from Xiaomi. Barra explained his decision had been strongly motivated by a feeling of detachment from his family and the life he had built up in Silicon Valley. "What I've realized is that the last few years of living in such a singular environment have taken a huge toll on my life and started affecting my health. My friends, what I consider to be my home, and my life are back in Silicon Valley, which is also much closer to my family. Seeing how much I've left behind these past few years, it is clear to me that the time has come to return."

There are reports that quoted Barra saying that his resignation was prompted by health reasons and some analysts noted that the departure came amid Xiaomi's declining sales in China. On the other hand, global expansion has been successful. Around the time of his resignation, Xiaomi announced that it has exceeded US$1 billion in revenue from the Indian market alone.

In July 2018, Xiaomi launched its initial public offering in the Hong Kong Stock Exchange, raising US$4.72 billion in capital, and valuing the company at US$54 billion, in the world's largest technology IPO since Alibaba went public in 2014. Barra's stake in Xiaomi was rumored to have been worth over US$200 million at the time of the IPO.

Facebook
He announced in a Facebook post on 25 January 2017 that he would be joining Facebook as Vice President of virtual reality, writing:

"I’m excited to share my next adventure as I return to Silicon Valley—in a couple of months I'll be joining Facebook as VP of virtual reality (VPVR!) and lead the Oculus team. Xiaomi CEO Lei Jun always says that the highest calling of an engineer is to make technology breakthroughs quickly and readily available to the widest possible spectrum of humanity. That will be my mission at Facebook and I look forward to building the future of immersive technology with Mark Zuckerberg, Brendan Trexler Iribe, Mike Schroepfer, and the visionaries in the Oculus team."Based on his early pronouncements, Barra appears to be focusing on the development of standalone VR headsets as well as social VR. During an appearance at the 2018 Consumer Electronics Show (CES), he described the technology as "a product category that will help us bring the most number of people into VR and really start unlocking these opportunities for social presence." During the event, Barra announced Oculus' standalone VR headset called Oculus Go, with Xiaomi and Qualcomm as global hardware partner. In May 2021, he left Facebook.

Lists
In 2011, Barra was ranked #23 in Wired Magazine's Wired 100. In 2013, Business Insider's Silicon Valley 100 included Barra at #92. Brazil's Época magazine ranked Barra among the most influential Brazilians in both 2011 and 2013. In 2015, Barra was ranked #14 in the 40-Under-40 list by Fortune Magazine.

References

External links

 

Living people
Brazilian businesspeople
Google employees
MIT School of Engineering alumni
Brazilian computer scientists
Xiaomi people
Year of birth missing (living people)